Robert "Bobby" Banas (born September 22, 1933) is an American dancer and actor. He is known for his work on movies such as West Side Story (1961), Always (1989) and Down and Out in Beverly Hills (1986). A dance he choreographed for the Shirley Ellis song "The Nitty Gritty" and performed (with five other dancers) on The Judy Garland Show in 1964, drew him renewed attention on YouTube in the 2010s, where copies of it have been viewed several million times (16.628.143 as of January 16, 2023) .

Early life 
Banas said he began to dance at age five. "I would immediately run and stand in a doorway pretending it was a frame for a small stage. I then would jive, moving my body to and fro, trying to keep up with the beat of the music, knowing that when the music would crescendo I’d leap in the air defying gravity, only to land in a heap. I’d pick myself up and start it all over again. I just couldn’t sit still when I’d hear those big bands: Tommy Dorsey, Ray Anthony, Count Basie, Les Brown and Stan Kenton."

During the war, his father became a Military Chief Inspector for the steel mills in McKeesport, Pennsylvania, while his mother became a propeller inspector for Curtiss-Wright in Erie.

In 1942, his father arranged ballroom dance lessons for Banas and his sister Faith. “I was on the move trying different lifts with Sis and we had so much fun; at times we couldn’t stop laughing. I just couldn’t stop. I had the music in me and had to move or explode.” Natalie Wood was his dancing partner in the Michael Panaieff Children’s’ Ballet Company, to which he received a scholarship and in which Jill St. John and Stefanie Powers were members. Banas also attended the Hollywood Professional School. He auditioned for the production of Carousel at the LA Civic Light Opera and was cast as Enoch Snow Jr. After that, he appeared in stage productions of Kiss Me Kate, Annie Get Your Gun, Brigadoon, Plain and Fancy, and Peter Pan.

Career 
Banas made appearances in such films as West Side Story, The Unsinkable Molly Brown and in Mary Poppins as a chimney sweep. He kissed Marilyn Monroe in Let's Make Love and made numerous television appearances, including an episode of Get Smart.  Banas later became a choreographer, as well as dance teacher in the Los Angeles area.

References

External links
 

1933 births
Living people
20th-century American male actors
American dancers
American male film actors
American male stage actors
American male television actors
People from New Jersey